"Hey Diddle Diddle" (also "Hi Diddle Diddle", "The Cat and the Fiddle", or "The Cow Jumped Over the Moon") is an English nursery rhyme. It has a Roud Folk Song Index number of 19478.

Lyrics and music
A version of the rhyme is:
Hey diddle diddle,
The cat and the fiddle,
The cow jumped over the moon;
The little dog laughed
To see such sport,
And the dish ran away with the spoon.

The rhyme is the source of the English expression "over the moon", meaning "delighted, thrilled, extremely happy".

The melody commonly associated with the rhyme was first recorded by the composer and nursery rhyme collector James William Elliott in his National Nursery Rhymes and Nursery Songs (1870). The word "sport" in the rhyme is sometimes replaced with "fun", "a sight", or "craft".

Origins

The rhyme may date back to at least the sixteenth century. Some references suggest it dates back in some form a thousand or more years: in early medieval illuminated manuscripts a cat playing a fiddle was a popular image. There is a reference in Thomas Preston's play A lamentable tragedy mixed ful of pleasant mirth, conteyning the life of Cambises King of Percia, printed in 1569 that may refer to the rhyme:

They be at hand Sir with stick and fiddle;
They can play a new dance called hey-diddle-diddle.

Another possible reference is in Alexander Montgomerie's The Cherry and the Slae from 1597:

But since you think't an easy thing
To mount above the moon,
Of your own fiddle take a spring
And dance when you have done.

The name "Cat and the Fiddle" was a common name for inns, including one known to have been at Old Chaunge, London by 1587.

The earliest recorded version of the poem resembling the modern form was printed around 1765 in London in Mother Goose's Melody with the lyrics:
Hey diddle diddle,
The Cat and the Fiddle,
The Cow jump'd over the Moon,
The little dog laugh'd to see such Craft,
And the Fork ran away with the Spoon.

In L. Frank Baum's "Mother Goose in Prose", the rhyme was written by a farm boy named Bobby who had just seen the cat running around with his fiddle clung to her tail, the cow jumping over the moon's reflection in the waters of a brook, the dog running around and barking with excitement, and the dish and the spoon from his supper sliding into the brook.

In J.R.R. Tolkien’s The Fellowship of the Ring, the rhyme was written by Bilbo Baggins, and is part of a much longer narrative poem.

Meaning
The numerous theories seeking to explain the rhyme have been largely discredited.  James Orchard Halliwell's suggestion that it was a corruption of an ancient Greek chorus was probably passed to him as a hoax by George Burges.
Another theory is that it comes from a low Dutch anti-clerical rhyme about priests demanding hard work. Still other theories refer to Hathor worship; various constellations such as Taurus and Canis Minor; Elizabeth, Lady Katherine Grey, and her relationships with the Earls of Hertford and Leicester; and the Flight from Egypt.
The “cat and the fiddle” has been tied to Catherine of Aragon (Katherine la Fidèle); Catherine I of Russia, the wife of Peter the Great; Canton de Fidèle, an alleged governor of Calais; and the game of cat (trap-ball). The profusion of unsupported explanations was satirised by J. R. R. Tolkien in his fictional explanations of "The Man in the Moon Stayed Up Too Late". Although there is some support for the trap-ball theory, scholarly commentators mostly conclude that the verse is simply meant to be nonsense.

See also 
List of nursery rhymes

Notes

External links

English nursery rhymes
Year of song unknown
Songwriter unknown
English folk songs
English children's songs
Traditional children's songs
Songs about cattle
Songs about cats
Songs about dogs
Songs about fiddles
Songs about the Moon